John Allen Polk (born March 18, 1949) is an American businessman and politician. A member of the Republican Party, he has served as the Mississippi State Senator from the 44th district since 2012.

Early life
John A. Polk was born on March 18, 1949, in Columbia, Mississippi. He was educated at the Prentiss High School in Prentiss, Mississippi. He graduated from the University of Southern Mississippi in 1974.

Career
Polk was an executive at Polk Meat Products, his family meat business. Since 2012, he has served as a Republican member of the Mississippi State Senate, representing District 44. In 2015, he proposed a bill for the repeal of annual vehicle inspections, arguing that cars are less dangerous now than they were when car stickers were introduced.

Polk was honored as the 2011 Alumni of the Year by the College of Business at his alma mater, the University of Southern Mississippi.

Personal life
Polk is married to Jan Barnett. They have a son, Brian Polk and a daughter, Julie Polk Breazeale. They reside in Hattiesburg, Mississippi. He is a Baptist.

References

Living people
1949 births
People from Columbia, Mississippi
People from Hattiesburg, Mississippi
University of Southern Mississippi alumni
American food industry business executives
Businesspeople from Mississippi
Republican Party Mississippi state senators
21st-century American politicians